Karen Kirstine Volf, also Wolff, née Hansen (1864–1946) was a Danish baker and pastry cook who in 1890 established a bakery in Hellerup, north of Copenhagen; this was unusual for a woman at that time and place. As a result of the popularity of her cakes and biscuits, by the early 1900s she was able to serve the whole of Copenhagen by introducing automobile-based deliveries. In the 1920s and 1930s, the business expended to the whole of Denmark with outlets throughout the country. Today her biscuits and cakes continue to be produced on an industrial scale as Karen Volf products by the Bisca establishment in Stege on the island of Møn.

Biography
Born on 20 June 1864 in Dåstrup, Roskilde Municipality, Karen Kirstine Hansen was the daughter of the farmer and miller Søren Hansen and his wife Ane Kirstine Andersen. In early 1890, she opened a small bakery business in Hellerup. It quickly proved to be a success, enabling her to save enough money to marry Christen Adolf Volf from the south of Jutland that August.

The couple's dairy and bakery shop on Strandvejen did so well that they were soon able to move into larger premises on Margrethevej. There Karen Volf developed a system of high volume production of cakes, biscuits and waffles. The early introduction of delivery by car enabled people to order by telephone and receive newly baked products at home. The business was so successful that around 1924 they had to move once again, this time establishing a completely new factory-based production facility near Kildegårds Plads able to produce large quantities of the popular pastries and biscuits. Adjacent to the factory there was a tea room serving hot drinks to accompany the pastries. Volf was honoured with visits by Crown Prince Frederik and Princess Thyra. With the assistance of their children Harriet Volf Jensen and Holger Volf, they were able to increase production in order to supply the whole country. 

Karen Volf died in Copenhagen on 6 April 1946.

References

Rxternal links

 Karen Volf

1864 births
1946 deaths
People from Roskilde Municipality
People from Gentofte Municipality
Danish bakers
Danish women business executives
Danish food industry businesspeople
20th-century Danish businesspeople
Pastry chefs
Burials at Hellerup Cemetery
Danish women company founders